Baden-Baden (foaled 1874 in Kentucky) was an American Thoroughbred racehorse best known for winning the 1877 Kentucky Derby. He was bred by A. J. Alexander at his Woodburn Stud in Woodford County, Kentucky. Baden-Baden was sired by Australian (GB) (who in turn was sired by West Australian, first horse to win the English Triple Crown in 1853); his dam, Lavender, was sired by Wagner.  He was purchased at Woodburn's yearling sale by Kentucky horseman Daniel Swigert, from Elmendorf Farm.

Racing career
After the sale, Baden-Baden was trained by future U.S. Racing Hall of Fame inductee Edward D. Brown. In his first start, jockey William Walker rode him to victory in the fledgling Kentucky Derby. Baden-Baden was then sold to New York City businessman William Backhouse Astor, Jr.

1877 Kentucky Derby
The weather was fair and the track, although dry, was "cuppy" from recent rains. The start was delayed by fractious horses; before the advent of the starting gate, Thoroughbreds raced from a standing start. Vera Cruz (ridden by Isaac Murphy) reared and stumbled, nearly unseating his rider and losing a great deal of ground. Robert Swim, on Leonard, took the lead. On the backstretch Baden-Baden (who had been in fourth place) began his run, reaching Leonard at the three-quarter-mile pole. He passed Leonard just as they turned into the stretch and they pounded down it together, Baden-Baden maintaining his lead.

Murphy was known for coming from behind, and that was what he tried here. He had begun his drive well before the stretch, and passed tiring horses until he was closing in on Baden-Baden and Leonard. Vera Cruz finally tired and finished fourth, with Baden-Baden first and Leonard second. The time for the 1½ miles (the Derby was run at that distance from its inauguration in 1875 until 1895) was a slow 2:38.

After the Derby
Racing for Astor at New York-area tracks, Baden-Baden finished third in the Belmont Stakes; he later won the prestigious Travers Stakes at Saratoga Race Course. He made his last start at the end of his three-year-old season in the Kenner Stakes, in which he broke a sesamoid bone. This injury ended Baden-Baden's racing career; he was retired to stud duty at William Astor's Ferncliffe Stud, where he sired many offspring (mostly daughters, with few successful) into the late 1880s.

Pedigree

References

External links
 Baden-Baden's Kentucky Derby charts

1874 racehorse births
Kentucky Derby winners
Racehorses bred in Kentucky
Racehorses trained in the United States
Thoroughbred family 12-b
Godolphin Arabian sire line